Équinoxe is the fourth studio album by French electronic musician and composer Jean-Michel Jarre, released in December 1978 on the Dreyfus record label, licensed to Polydor Records for its worldwide distribution. The album featured two singles: "Équinoxe Part 4" and "Équinoxe Part 5", the latter having more success reaching No. 45 on the UK Singles Chart. It reached number 11 on the UK Album Chart and number 126 on the US Billboard 200 chart.

Composition and recording 
The album was recorded from January to August 1978 in the makeshift recording studio set up in his apartment in Paris. The making of the album was done with a 16-track MCI tape. Jarre stated that although his previous album Oxygène was created without a concept in mind, Équinoxe was intended to represent a day in the life of a person, from waking up in the morning to sleeping at night.

The aquatic, rain, storm and thunder sounds that play on various tracks were designed by French sound engineer Michel Geiss. Apart from using the ARP 2600, Jarre also used liberal echo whips in the various sound effects generated by the EMS VCS 3 synthesizer. Both the Eminent 310 Unique organ and the VCS 3 went through an Electro Harmonix Small Stone guitar phasing pedal in order to provide the string pads used on the album. The main sound of "Équinoxe Part 1" was created using Eminent's SUST string configuration. The album also used the Korg KR 55 drum machine.

Jarre's musical ideas were initially recorded on a small cassette recorder, "as an audio scratch pad". Jarre considered discarding one of the recordings as he did not think that it was good enough, but Geiss convinced him to keep it, and the track later became "Équinoxe Part 7". Jarre also told Geiss that one of his wishes was to get a sequencer based on a matrix. Geiss designed the Matrisequencer 250, an 2x50 note instrument which "became one of the main instruments in Équinoxe." The Rhythmicomputer designed by Geiss also was used. The album was mixed at Gang Studio by Jean-Pierre Janiaud with assistance from Patrick Foulon.

Artwork 
As with Oxygène, the cover art for Équinoxe used a painting by Michel Granger, in this case, Le trac (Stage Fright). Granger visited Jarre's private mansion in Croissy to present him with different paintings that would illustrate the album cover. Each of the canvases was projected by light cannons, and Le trac was immediately chosen by Jean-Michel.

Release and promotion
Équinoxe was released in December 1978 by Disques Dreyfus and internationally by Polydor Records, The album was promoted in London, UK. Two singles were released from the album, "Équinoxe Part 4" and "Équinoxe Part 5", the latter having more success reaching No. 45 on the UK Singles Chart and was described as a "synth-pop primer." The release was followed by a laser show and fireworks directed by Disques Dreyfus outside the Palais des Festival, Cannes where the album was broadcast at high volume on the public address system, and also by a February 1979 promotional tour in the United States.

A concert on the Place de la Concorde, Paris was held on 14 July of that year. The concert attracted over a million people, at the time the largest crowd for an outdoor concert. Although it was not the first time he had performed in concert (Jarre had already played at the Paris Opera Ballet), the 40 minute-long event, which used projections of light, images and fireworks, served as a blueprint for Jarre's future concerts. Its popularity helped create a surge in sales—a further 800,000 records were sold between 14 July and 31 August 1979—and the Frenchman Francis Rimbert featured at the event. Along with its 1976 predecessor, both sold more than 1.5 million copies in France and in 1981, it would be certified platinum, in November 1979, both sold 11 million worldwide.

Critical reception

Contemporary critical reception for the album in the UK was negative. Davitt Sigerson of Melody Maker said "it is as slushily, pseudo-galactically crass and vapid as last year's Oxygène. The melodies are trite, harmonies predictable, textures almost determinedly hackneyed (even down to artificial 'weather' effects to generate mood). There isn't even much that's danceable." In Record Mirror, Steve Gett called the album "very artificial and as a result quite emotionless." He continued saying that, "As far as i was concerned the effect was one of sleep inducement, basically because it seems so lifeless and infinite, never reaching a specific goal but merely drifting on."

In the US, Cashbox wrote that "the result is a complex, starkly-toned album which is surprisingly accessible and invigorating. Although even liberal AOR stations may hesitate to place this LP on steady rotating, Jarre's sizable following plus adventurous rock fans will find this LP fascinating." The Pittsburgh Press described the album as "a moody, melodic, masterful synthesizer symphony" and "a dazzling musical poem, a pleasure to listen to, a delight to experience." In The Bulletin, William D. Loffler commented that the "titles are meaningless because the music is something like a stretched-out electronic tone poem." Retrospective reviews of the album have been more favourable. Phil Alexander of Mojo listed it as one of Jarre's three key albums, noting the influence of abstract art and classical composers Claude Debussy, Maurice Ravel and Nino Rota on Équinoxe, and wrote that "Jarre attempted to trace the human experience from morning to night across eight tracks on an album that is sensual and, in places, deeply melancholic."

Mike DeGagne of AllMusic commented, "As the follow up album to Oxygène, Équinoxe offers the same mesmerizing effect, with rapid spinning sequencer washes and bubbling synthesizer portions all lilting back and forth to stardust scatterings of electronic pastiches. Using more than 13 different types of synthesizers, Jarre combines whirling soundscapes of multi-textured effects, passages, and sometimes suites to culminate interesting electronic atmospheres... So much electronic color is added to every track that it is impossible to concentrate on any particular segment, resulting in waves of synth drowning the ears at high tide."

Legacy 
"Équinoxe Part 1", "Équinoxe Part 3" and "Équinoxe Part 4" were used in Cosmos: A Personal Voyage by Carl Sagan, however they were not included on the series' soundtrack albums. In the 1984 computer game for Commodore 64, Loco, a remake of "Équinoxe Part 5" and "Équinoxe Part 6" by Ben Daglish was used. In 2018, four decades after the album's release, Jarre produced a sequel, titled Equinoxe Infinity.

Track listing
All tracks are composed by Jean-Michel Jarre.

Side one
 "Équinoxe Part 1" – 2:23
 "Équinoxe Part 2" – 5:01
 "Équinoxe Part 3" – 5:11
 "Équinoxe Part 4" – 6:52

Side two
 "Équinoxe Part 5" – 3:54
 "Équinoxe Part 6" – 3:15
 "Équinoxe Part 7" – 7:24
 "Équinoxe Part 8" – 5:02

Personnel 
Personnel listed in album liner notes:
Jean-Michel Jarre – production
Jean-Pierre Janiaud – mixing engineer
Patrick Foulon – mixing assistant
Michel Granger – artwork
Helmut Newton – back photography

Equipment
Adapted from the liner notes of the 2014 remastered version.
ARP 2600
EMS VCS 3
EMS Synthi AKS
Yamaha CS-60
Oberheim Polyphonic Synthesizer
RMI Harmonic Synthesizer
ELKA 707
Korg Polyphonic
Eminent 310 Unique
Mellotron
ARP Sequencer
Oberheim Digital Sequencer
Matrisequencer 250
Rythmicomputer
Korg KR 55
EMS Vocoder 1000

Charts

Weekly charts

Year-end charts

Certifications and sales

References

Sources

External links
 Équinoxe at Discogs

1978 albums
Jean-Michel Jarre albums
Dreyfus Records albums
Polydor Records albums
Concept albums
Electronic albums by French artists
Ambient albums by French artists
Space music albums by French artists
New-age albums by French artists